Heljo Mänd (until 1934 Heljo Kleinmüller, 1934-1946 Heljo Raidla; 11 February 1926 Narva – 6 December 2020) was an Estonian children's writer, novelist, newspaper editor and poet.

In 1956 she was an editor for the children and youth newspaper Säde, from 1958 until 1965 she was an editor for the children’s magazine Pioneer, and 1960 until 1965 an editor for the children’s magazine Täheke. Since 1965 she was a freelance writer.

Since 1961 she was a member of Estonian Writers' Union.

Selected works
 television script: "Mõmmi ja aabits" ('Teddy's ABC')
 television script: "Nõiakivi" ('The Magic Stone')
 1968: story "Toomas Linnupoeg" ('Thomas Bird-Boy') 
 1971: alphabet book "Karu-aabits" ('Teddy's ABC'), 
 1984: short-story collection "Väikesed võililled" ('Little Dandelions'). 
 2017 poem "Salasõna" ('Password')

References

1926 births
2020 deaths
Estonian children's writers
Estonian women children's writers
Estonian women poets
20th-century Estonian poets
21st-century Estonian poets
20th-century Estonian women writers
21st-century Estonian women writers
Estonian women novelists
Estonian editors
Estonian women editors
Estonian magazine editors
Women magazine editors
Estonian women short story writers
People from Narva